The Cebu Trans-Axial Expressway is a proposed 4-lane, 300-kilometer, limited-access toll expressway in the Philippines. When completed, it would be the Philippines' longest expressway, being more than three times longer than the Subic–Clark–Tarlac Expressway (SCTEX). It could also decongest most of Cebu island's coastal roads and protect the island's coastal areas from unexpected exploits.

The expressway will be initially built with two lanes, one for each direction. As soon as these lanes became operational, another carriageway will be built.

The government shoulders the financing for the construction, but upon completion, the operation and maintenance of toll facility will be offered to the private sector through concession.

References

External links 
 Cebu - North Coastal Road

Proposed roads in the Philippines
Roads in Cebu
Toll roads in the Philippines